The Wonderful O is the last of James Thurber’s five short-book fairy tales for children. Published in 1957 by Hamish Hamilton / Simon Schuster, it followed Many Moons (1943), The Great Quillow (1944), The White Deer (1945) and The 13 Clocks (1950).

As well as constant, complex wordplay, Thurber uses other literary devices such as frequent internal meter or rhythmic prose, near-poetry, puns, literary allusions (e.g. to wandering minstrels) and thus creates a humorous satire involving loss, love and freedom. The Wonderful O uses a form of constrained writing or lipogram where the letter O is omitted at the demands of the villains.

“I’ll build you a better man of firmer flesh and all complete, from hairy head to metatarsal feet, using A’s and I’s and U’s and E’s with muscular arms and flexible knees; eyes and ears and lids and lips, neck and chest and breast and hips; … ”

It was one of several of Thurber's works illustrated by his friend and frequent illustrator Marc Simont after Thurber went blind during the 1950s.

The 2009 reprint by The New York Review Children's Collection, has the original illustrations by Marc Simont.

For the Puffin Books edition, (1962) The Wonderful O was joined with The 13 Clocks, and both stories were illustrated by Ronald Searle.

Reviews
"Linguistic romp with an important lesson at its heart" (London Review of Books)
"A tale of loss, liberty and language laced with typical Thurberian wit" (London Review of Books)
"The period coloured illustrations add to the charm to make a very inviting book" (School Librarian)
"A Thimbleful of Thurber" (Los Angeles Times)
Melissa Manchester was nominated for Grammy Award for Best Spoken Word Album for Children
The Wonderful O (James Thurber) (Album)

Sources
 Penguin (Puffin Books) edition (1962) 
 New York Review Children's Collection  (2009)  
 Brian Attebery, The Fantasy Tradition in American Literature,   (1980)

1957 children's books
American children's books
Works by James Thurber
Books illustrated by Marc Simont
Constrained writing